The Ely Wright House is a historic house located at 901 Sixth Street in Wausau, Wisconsin. It was added to the National Register of Historic Places on March 1, 1982.

Description and history 
The fine Italianate style house is two stories, clapboard-clad, with a rectangular cupola. The hood moulds above the windows are decorated with a vine carving. The front door has an elliptical fanlight and sidelights framed by a porch with Doric columns. It was designed and built by John Mercer in 1881.

The house belonged to Ely Wright. Wright was a native of Athens, Pennsylvania who came to Wausau in the 1870s and founded Wausau Iron Works, which built machinery for railroads and sawmills in Wisconsin.

References

Houses in Marathon County, Wisconsin
Houses completed in 1881
Houses on the National Register of Historic Places in Wisconsin
Italianate architecture in Wisconsin
National Register of Historic Places in Marathon County, Wisconsin
1881 establishments in Wisconsin